Louisa Maria Teresa Stuart (28 June 1692 – 18 April 1712), known to Jacobites as The Princess Royal, was the last child of James II and VII, the deposed king of England, Scotland and Ireland, by his second wife Mary of Modena. Like her brother James Francis Edward Stuart (The Old Pretender), Louisa Maria was a Roman Catholic, which, under the Act of Settlement 1701, debarred them both from succession to the British throne after the death of their Protestant half-sister Anne, Queen of Great Britain.

A Royal Stuart Society paper calls Louisa Maria the Princess over the Water, an allusion to the informal title King over the Water of the Jacobite pretenders, none of whom had any other legitimate daughters.

Birth
Louisa Maria was born in 1692, at Saint-Germain-en-Laye in France, four years after her father had fled England never to return. Owing to the huge controversy which had surrounded the birth of her brother, James Francis Edward, with accusations of the substitution of another baby in a warming pan following a still-birth, James II had sent letters inviting not only his daughter, Queen Mary II, to attend the birth in person, but also a large number of other Protestant ladies. The Whig historian Macaulay later commented on James's precaution: 

After the birth, James II declared that Louisa Maria had been sent by God as a consolation for her parents at the time of their deepest distress, in exile and hopelessness. In later years, she was often referred to as La Consolatrice.

The new-born princess was given the name Louisa Maria in baptism, while Teresa (sometimes spelt Theresa) was added later, at the time of her confirmation. Her godparents were King Louis XIV of France (in whose honour she was named), and King Louis's sister-in-law, Elizabeth Charlotte, Princess Palatine, Duchess of Orléans.

James II had fathered numerous children by his two wives, but only four of them survived infancy, and the two Protestant elder children, Queen Mary II and the future Queen Anne, lived in England. Only her brother James Francis Edward was close to Louisa, although she did have some contact with her elder half-sisters, Mary, who died while Louisa Maria was still a small child, and Anne with whom she remained on friendly terms.

Life

Louisa was the only full sibling of Prince James Francis Edward, the 'Old Pretender', to survive infancy, and was four years younger than her brother. The two were brought up together in France.

Louisa's tutor was an English Roman Catholic priest, Father Constable, who taught her Latin, history, and religion. She also had a governess, the Countess of Middleton, wife of the Jacobite peer Charles, 2nd Earl of Middleton. James Drummond, 4th Earl of Perth, another Jacobite peer living in France, praised the child's natural affability.

An allegorical portrait by Alexis Simon Belle of James Francis Edward and his sister Louisa Maria, showing the prince as a guardian angel leading his sister under the gaze of cherubim, was painted in 1699 and is now in the Royal Collection.

By the summer of 1701, King James was seriously ill, and had been away from Saint Germain seeking medical treatment, accompanied by his wife. However, in June the two returned home for the birthdays of their two children, and two months later James suffered a stroke, dying just two weeks later on 16 September. He was still able to talk when his children visited him for the last time, and to Louisa Maria he said: 

Soon after James's death, Louis XIV proclaimed James Francis Edward as king of England, Scotland and Ireland, and he was also formally recognised as king by Spain, the Papal States and Modena. He and his sister Louisa Maria were transferred to Passy, into the care of Antoine Nompar de Caumont and his wife, with Lady Middleton continuing as Louisa Maria's governess there.

In 1705, at the age of thirteen, Louisa Maria was a guest of honour at a ball at the Château de Marly, ranking only after Louis XIV himself, her own mother Queen Mary, and her brother James Francis Edward, considered by Louis to be another King.

On 23 March 1708, after a delay caused by the measles, the young James attempted a landing on Scottish soil, at the Firth of Forth, supported by a fleet of French ships. However, the force was driven off by a Royal Navy fleet led by Admiral Byng.

Louisa Maria enjoyed dancing and the opera, and became popular at the French court. Two possible matches for her were considered, with Louis XIV's grandson Charles, Duke of Berry (1686–1714), and with King Charles XII of Sweden (1682–1718). Neither took place, the first apparently due to Louisa Maria's equivocal position, and the second because the young King of Sweden was not a Roman Catholic.

Louisa felt keenly that Jacobite supporters in exile had made huge sacrifices for her family, and she herself paid for the daughters of many of them to be educated, making no distinction between Roman Catholics and Protestants, supporting the daughters of both.

Death

In April 1712, both James Francis Edward and his sister fell sick with smallpox. While the Old Pretender recovered, Louisa Maria died on 28 April (18 April, Old Style), aged 19, and was buried with her father at the Church of the English Benedictines in Paris. A French nobleman wrote of the death of the Princess to a friend at Utrecht:

My Lord, I send to you by these the sad and deplorable news of the much lamented death of the Princess Royal of England who died of the smallpox the 18th of this month at St Germains who as she was one of the greatest ornaments of that afflicted court, so she was the admiration of all Europe; never Princess was so universally regretted. Her death has filled all France with sighs, groans and tears. She was a Princess of a majestical mien and port; every motion spoke grandeur, every action was easy and without any affectation or meanness, and proclaim'd her a heroine descended from the long race of so many paternal and maternal heroes...

William Legge, 1st Earl of Dartmouth, the British Secretary of State, wrote of the Princess's death: 

Madame de Maintenon, the morganatic second wife of Louis XIV, wrote of Mary of Modena's reaction to Louisa Maria's death: 

In his The History of the Church of Scotland (1845), Thomas Stephen says of the death:

Like many other churches in Paris, the Church of the English Benedictines was desecrated and vandalised during the French Revolution. According to Jules Janin, writing in 1844, the remains of Princess Louisa Maria and her father King James II were then resting in the military hospital of the Val-de-Grâce.

Portraits

Several portraits of Louisa Maria survive. Among those of Louisa Maria alone, one is by François de Troy, ca. 1705, while another, painted about 1704, is attributed to Alexis Simon Belle and is in the National Portrait Gallery, London. Also in the National Portrait Gallery is a portrait painted in 1695 by Nicolas de Largillière of Louisa Maria with her brother James Francis Edward. This was engraved as a mezzotint by John Smith and published in 1699. Another portrait of Louisa Maria with her brother, depicting him as an angel, is in the Royal Collection and is again attributed to Belle. A portrait with a cavalier King Charles spaniel was engraved as a mezzotint by Bernard Lens the Younger and published c. 1700.

In fiction
Princess Louisa appears at the age of twelve in Eliza Haywood's picaresque novel The Fortunate Foundlings (1744). Haywood says of Louisa:

Namesakes
The names Louisa Maria Teresa (in French, Louise-Marie-Thérèse) were later used for Luisa Maria Teresa of Parma (1751–1819), Queen consort of Charles IV of Spain, for Louise Marie Thérèse of France, the eldest daughter of Charles Ferdinand, Duke of Berry, born 1819, and for Louise Marie Thérèse Charlotte Isabelle of Orléans, daughter of King Louis-Philippe of France and the Queen of King Leopold I of Belgium.

Family and ancestry

Sources
Ancestors of Louisa Maria Theresa, Princess of England, Scotland and Ireland at worldroots.com
Addington, A. C., The Royal House of Stuart (London, 1969, third edition 1976)

See also
Jacobitism
Act of Settlement 1701
Correspondence with James the Pretender (High Treason) Act 1701
Monument to the Royal Stuarts

Bibliography
A true and full account of the death and character of the Princess-Royal, Louisa-Maria-Teresa Stuart, daughter of the late King James. Who was born in the year 1692, at St Germains, and died of the small-pox the 18th of April 1712... In a letter from a noble-man of France, to his correspondent at Vtrecht broadside, 2 s., 1712
Cole, Susan, Princess over the Water: A Memoir of Louise Marie Stuart (1692–1712) (The Royal Stuart Society papers, Paper XVIII)

References

External links
Portraits of Princess Louisa Maria Theresa Stuart at the web site of the National Portrait Gallery
Louisa Maria Theresa Stuart at thepeerage.com

People from Saint-Germain-en-Laye
1692 births
1712 deaths
18th-century English people
17th-century Scottish people
18th-century Scottish people
17th-century English women
17th-century English people
18th-century English women
17th-century Scottish women
18th-century Scottish women
Louisa Maria
Louisa Maria
Louisa Maria
Jacobites
Deaths from smallpox
Infectious disease deaths in France
Burials at Val-de-Grâce (church)
Princesses Royal
Children of James II of England
Daughters of kings